Kupia, or Balmiki, is an Indo-Aryan language related to Odia and spoken by Valmiki people in the Indian state of Odisha and Andhra Pradesh. The Valmiki are a tribal group, concentrated in the districts of Koraput of Odisha and Visakhapatnam of Andhra Pradesh.

Script 
Kupia language is usually written in Odia or Telugu script depending on the region where the community lives. A new Kupia alphabet was also created by Sathupati Prasanna Sree.

References

Eastern Indo-Aryan languages
Odia language